Furcivena is a genus of moths of the family Crambidae.

Species
Furcivena cyanoxantha Meyrick, 1933
Furcivena dialithalis Hampson, 1917
Furcivena euclidialis (Hampson, 1906)
Furcivena rhodoneurialis Hampson, 1898
Furcivena strigiferalis Hampson, 1896

References

Pyraustinae
Crambidae genera
Taxa named by George Hampson